Kevin Doherty is an independent filmmaker, playwright and writer from Winnipeg, Manitoba.

Stage work
Lester Gets KISSed (2008, wrote and directed, collaboration with Alan MacKenzie)
The Green Room (2010, wrote and directed, collaboration with Scott Cranwill)
Brain Cravers: The Curse of Extollo (2011/2014, wrote and directed, collaboration with Scott Cranwill)

Filmography

Feature films
Black Bridge (2007)
Wild Turkeys (2008)
Lights Camera BLOOD! (2015)

Short films
Toaster Toaster on the Wall (1998)
I Come in Pieces (2000)
Something for Santa (2002)Green Screen (2009, co-written and co-directed with Alan MacKenzie)The Jogger'' (2015)

References

External links
 
 
 Profile at Winnipeg Film Group

Living people
Film directors from Winnipeg
Writers from Winnipeg
Canadian male screenwriters
Year of birth missing (living people)